Sugar Creek is a stream in Fillmore County, in the U.S. state of Minnesota.

Sugar Creek was named for the sugar maple trees lining its banks.

See also
List of rivers of Minnesota

References

Rivers of Fillmore County, Minnesota
Rivers of Minnesota